Xola is a station on Line 2 of the Mexico City Metro system. It is located in the Colonia Moderna and Colonia Alamos districts of the Benito Juárez borough of Mexico City, directly south of the city centre on Calzada de Tlalpan. It is a surface station.

General information
The station logo shows a coconut palm tree. The name comes from the 19th century "Xola" hacienda that existed in the current site of the station. The hacienda housed an enormous specimen of coconut palm tree, of which some still stand on the sidewalk of the nearby Xola Avenue.  The station opened on 1 August 1970.

Ridership

Exits
East: Calzada de Tlalpan between Juana de Arco street and Napoleón street, Colonia Moderna
West: Calzada de Tlalpan between Toledo street and Xola, Colonia Álamos

See also
List of Mexico City metro stations

References

External links 

Xola
Railway stations opened in 1970
1970 establishments in Mexico
Mexico City Metro stations in Benito Juárez, Mexico City
Accessible Mexico City Metro stations